Alhassane Ousmane Touré (born 5 February 1984 in Baguinéda
) is a Malian footballer, who currently plays for FC La Chaux-de-Fonds.

Career 
Touré started his career in the Centre Salif Keita and played from 2001 until 2003 for Djoliba AC, who won the Malien Premiere Division and the Malien Cup. He spent most of his career in Switzerland, he played during his career 7 games in the Swiss Super League for FC Schaffhausen and 78 games in the Challenge League for FC Bulle, respectively FC La Chaux-de-Fonds. Since 2009 played in the 2. Liga interregional for FC Serrières, FC Portalban/Gletterens and one year 2013 on loan from Portalban, for FC Bulle.

International career
Touré capped for the Mali U-20 team at the 2003 FIFA World Youth Championship. He played also from 2004 to 2008 in 17 official FIFA games for the Mali national football team.

Notes

1984 births
Living people
Malian footballers
Malian expatriate footballers
Mali under-20 international footballers
Mali international footballers
Association football forwards
Swiss Super League players
Swiss Challenge League players
FC Schaffhausen players
Djoliba AC players
FC Serrières players
FC La Chaux-de-Fonds players
Expatriate footballers in Switzerland
Place of birth missing (living people)
People from Koulikoro Region
21st-century Malian people